Mykola Filaretovich Kolessa (6 December 1903 – 8 June 2006) was a Ukrainian composer and conductor, born in Sambir near Lviv.

His father Filaret was a Ukrainian ethnomusicologist and composer and his cousin was the pianist Lubka Kolessa. He graduated from Lysenko Higher Musical Institute, then studied in Prague under Vítězslav Novák and Otakar Ostrčil, and taught at Lviv Conservatory. His works include two symphonies (1949 and 1966), symphonic variations (1931), a 'Ukrainian Suite' (1928), all for orchestra, and 'In the Mountains' for string orchestra (1972), and a number of chamber and incidental works as well as some song cycles. His composition style was tonal and conservative and has been linked to that of Alexander Glazunov, although influences from Bartok and the early 20th-century French school can be heard as well. As a conductor he worked with ensembles such as the Lviv Philharmonic Orchestra, the Ballet Theater, the Ukrainian Radio Symphony Orchestra, and the Trembita Choir, becoming the founder of the Lviv conducting school.

References

External links 
 Brief biography and worklist at Onno van Rijen's site
 Mykola Kolessa's works for organ
 

1903 births
2006 deaths
20th-century conductors (music)
Ukrainian classical composers
Ukrainian conductors (music)
Ukrainian centenarians
Male conductors (music)
Chevaliers of the Order of Merit (Ukraine)
People's Artists of the USSR
Recipients of the title of Hero of Ukraine
Recipients of the Shevchenko National Prize
Burials at Lychakiv Cemetery
Academic staff of Lviv Conservatory
People from Sambir
Men centenarians
20th-century male musicians
Ukrainian Austro-Hungarians
People from the Kingdom of Galicia and Lodomeria
Recipients of the title of Merited Artist of Ukraine